The Trouble with Normal is a 1983 studio album by Canadian singer-songwriter Bruce Cockburn. The album contains nine songs (eleven in the 2002 remastered release). It marks a continuing shift from Cockburn's early folk-influenced and "mystic" acoustic works, featuring electric guitar and synthesizers, but the lyrical themes build on earlier albums.

True North released a remastered deluxe version on November 19, 2002 which includes two extra tracks recorded during the same sessions.

Reception

In a retrospective review, Allmusic critic Brett Hartenbach wrote, "Like his two previous efforts in the '80s, The Trouble With Normal places Bruce Cockburn yet another step further from his days as Canada's resident mystic folky. And while he had touched on similar musical themes on earlier recordings, the eclectic blend of folk, rock, and world music here is much more defined and realized... There is the tendency to get heavy-handed at times, but still, The Trouble With Normal contains some of Cockburn's most beautifully imagistic writing to date and is another strong effort."

Track listing

"Cala Luna" was originally released as a bonus track on the cassette, at the end of side 1, after "Waiting for the Moon".

Personnel
Bruce Cockburn – vocals, guitar, dulcimer
Jon Goldsmith – keyboards
Hugh Marsh – mandolin, violin
Dennis Pendrith – bass, Chapman Stick
Bob Disalle – drums
Dick Smith – percussion
Shaun Jackson – backing vocals
Colina Phillips – backing vocals

Production
Gene Martynec – producer
Gary Gray – engineer
George Marino – mastering
Vladimir Meller – remastering
Sharon Williams – backing vocals
George Whiteside – photography
Michael Wurstin – art direction

References 

1983 albums
Bruce Cockburn albums
Albums produced by Gene Martynec
True North Records albums